First Union New Zealand is a national trade union in New Zealand that was formed on 1 October 2011 by the merger of the National Distribution Union and Finsec. 

On 7 November 2018, the New Zealand Bakers, Pastrycooks and Related Employees Union amalgamated into First Union. The New Zealand Bakers, Pastrycooks and Related Employees Union reported having 443 members on March 1, 2018, in its annual membership return. 

First Union has a membership of more than 30,000 as of 1 March 2021  and is affiliated with the New Zealand Council of Trade Unions. It is also affiliated to various international federations through its five sectors; Finance, Industrial (Textile, Clothing, Baking, Wood, Energy), Retail, Stores (distribution and logistics) and Transport. While not affiliated with the New Zealand Labour Party, former NDU secretary Laila Harré (as an Alliance MP) served in the Fifth Labour Government as Minister for Women's Affairs and was the primary architect of the country's paid parental leave system.

The current General Secretary is Dennis Maga, the first Asian New Zealander to lead a major New Zealand trade union. Maga was born in the Philippines and elected general secretary in November 2017.

References

External links
 FIRST Union official site.

New Zealand Council of Trade Unions
Trade unions in New Zealand
Trade unions established in 2011